Chandlerville is a village in Cass County, Illinois, United States. The population was 527 at the 2020 census.

History
Chandlerville was named for its founder, Dr. Charles Chandler.

Geography

Demographics

As of the 2020 census there were 527 people, 217 households, and 103 families residing in the village. The racial makeup of the village was 96.39% White, 0.57% African American, 0.19% Native American, 0.95% Asian, 1.14% from other races, and 0.76% from two or more races. Hispanic or Latino of any race were 1.33% of the population.

There were 217 households, out of which 40.09% had children under the age of 18 living with them, 36.87% were married couples living together, 7.83% had a female householder with no husband present, and 52.53% were non-families. 50.69% of all households were made up of individuals, and 29.95% had someone living alone who was 65 years of age or older. The average household size was 2.88 and the average family size was 1.98.

The village's age distribution consisted of 22.8% under the age of 18, 6.5% from 18 to 24, 16.9% from 25 to 44, 27.4% from 45 to 64, and 26.5% who were 65 years of age or older. The median age was 46.4 years. For every 100 females, there were 129.9 males. For every 100 females age 18 and over, there were 129.0 males.

The median income for a household in the village was $38,750, and the median income for a family was $66,875. Males had a median income of $52,188 versus $23,250 for females. The per capita income for the village was $33,350. About 9.7% of families and 20.0% of the population were below the poverty line, including 46.9% of those under age 18 and 2.6% of those age 65 or over.

References

Villages in Cass County, Illinois
Villages in Illinois